

Events

1601–1900
1812 – Prime Minister Spencer Perceval is assassinated by John Bellingham in the lobby of the British House of Commons.
1813 – William Lawson, Gregory Blaxland and William Wentworth discover a route across the Blue Mountains, opening up inland Australia to settlement.
1857 – Indian Rebellion of 1857: Indian rebels seize Delhi from the British.
1880 – Seven people are killed in the Mussel Slough Tragedy, a gun battle in California.
1889 – An attack upon a U.S. Army paymaster and escort results in the theft of over $28,000 and the award of two Medals of Honor.
1894 – Four thousand Pullman Palace Car Company workers go on a wildcat strike.

1901–present
1919 – Uruguay becomes a signatory to the Buenos Aires copyright treaty.
1970 – The 1970 Lubbock tornado kills 26 and causes $250 million in damage.
1985 – Fifty-six spectators die and more than 200 are injured in the Bradford City stadium fire.
1996 – After the aircraft's departure from Miami, a fire started by improperly handled chemical oxygen generators in the cargo hold of Atlanta-bound ValuJet Airlines Flight 592 causes the Douglas DC-9 to crash in the Florida Everglades, killing all 110 on board.
1997 – Deep Blue, a chess-playing supercomputer, defeats Garry Kasparov in the last game of the rematch, becoming the first computer to beat a world-champion chess player in a classic match format.
1998 – India conducts three underground atomic tests in Pokhran.
2011 – An earthquake of magnitude 5.1 hits Lorca, Spain.
2013 – Fifty-two people are killed in a bombing in Reyhanlı, Turkey. 
2014 – Fifteen people are killed and 46 injured in Kinshasa in a stampede caused by tear gas being thrown into soccer stands by police officers.
2016 – One hundred and ten people are killed in an ISIL bombing in Baghdad.
2022 – the Burmese military executes at least 37 villagers during the Mon Taing Pin massacre in Sagaing, Myanmar.

Births

Pre-1600
1571 – Niwa Nagashige, Japanese daimyō (d. 1637)

1601–1900
1715 – Johann Gottfried Bernhard Bach, German organist (d. 1739)
1752 – Johann Friedrich Blumenbach, German physician, physiologist, and anthropologist (d. 1840)
1797 – José Mariano Salas, Mexican general and politician (d. 1867)
1811 – Jean-Jacques Challet-Venel, Swiss politician (d. 1893)
1852 – Charles W. Fairbanks, American journalist and politician, 26th United States Vice President (d. 1918)
1854 – Jack Blackham, Australian cricketer (d. 1932)
1869 – Archibald Warden, English tennis player (d. 1943)
1871 – Frank Schlesinger, American astronomer and author (d. 1943)
1875 – Harriet Quimby, American pilot and screenwriter (d. 1912)
1881 – Al Cabrera, Spanish-Cuban baseball player and manager (d. 1964)
  1881   – Jan van Gilse, Dutch composer and conductor (d. 1944)
  1881   – Theodore von Kármán, Hungarian-American mathematician, physicist, and engineer (d. 1963)
1888 – Irving Berlin, Belarusian-American pianist and composer (d. 1989)
  1888   – Willis Augustus Lee, American admiral (d. 1945)
1889 – Paul Nash, British painter (d. 1946)
1890 – Willie Applegarth, English-American sprinter (d. 1958)
  1890   – Helge Løvland, Norwegian decathlete (d. 1984)
1894 – Martha Graham, American dancer and choreographer (d. 1991)
1895 – Jacques Brugnon, French tennis player (d. 1978)
  1895   – Jiddu Krishnamurti, Indian philosopher and speaker (d. 1986)
  1895   – William Grant Still, American composer and conductor (d. 1978)
1896 – Josip Štolcer-Slavenski, Croatian composer and academic (d. 1955)
1897 – Robert E. Gross, American businessman (d. 1961)

1901–present 
1901 – Rose Ausländer, Ukrainian-English poet and author (d. 1988)
  1901   – Gladys Rockmore Davis, American painter (d. 1967)
1902 – Edna Ernestine Kramer, American mathematician (d. 1984)
1903 – Charlie Gehringer, American baseball player and manager (d. 1993)
1904 – Salvador Dalí, Spanish artist (d. 1989)
1905 – Lise de Baissac, Mauritian-born SOE agent, war hero (d. 2004)
  1905   – Catherine Bauer Wurster, American architect and public housing advocate (d. 1964)
1907 – Rip Sewell, American baseball player and coach (d. 1989)
1911 – Mitchell Sharp, Canadian economist and politician, 23rd Canadian Minister of Finance (d. 2004)
  1911   – Phil Silvers, American actor and comedian (d. 1985)
1912 – Saadat Hasan Manto, Indian-Pakistani author and screenwriter (d. 1955)
1916 – Camilo José Cela, Spanish author and politician, Nobel Prize laureate (d. 2002)
1918 – Richard Feynman, American physicist and engineer, Nobel Prize laureate (d. 1988)
1921 – Robin Barbour, Scottish minister and author (d. 2014)
  1921   – Hildegard Hamm-Brücher, German politician (d. 2016)
1924 – Antony Hewish, English astronomer and academic, Nobel Prize laureate (d. 2021)
1925 – Edward J. King, American football player and politician, 66th Governor of Massachusetts (d. 2006)
1927 – Bernard Fox, British actor (d. 2016)
  1927   – Gene Savoy, American explorer, author, and scholar (d. 2007)
1930 – Edsger W. Dijkstra, Dutch computer scientist and academic (d. 2002)
  1930   – Stanley Elkin, American novelist, short story writer, and essayist (d. 1995)
1932 – Valentino Garavani, Italian fashion designer
1933 – Louis Farrakhan, American religious leader
1934 – Jim Jeffords, American captain, lawyer, and politician (d. 2014)
  1934   – Jack Twyman, American basketball player (d. 2012)
1935 – Francisco Umbral, Spanish journalist and author (d. 2007)
1937 – Ildikó Újlaky-Rejtő, Hungarian Olympic and world champion foil fencer
1938 – Narendra Patel, Baron Patel, Tanzanian-English obstetrician, academic, and politician
1941 – Eric Burdon, English musician 
  1941   – Ian Redpath, Australian cricketer and coach
1943 – Nancy Greene, Canadian skier and politician
1944 – John Benaud, Australian cricketer
1948 – Jack Cantoni, French rugby player (d. 2013)
  1948   – Nirj Deva, Sri Lankan-English politician
1950 – Jeremy Paxman, English journalist and author
  1950   – Sadashiv Amrapurkar, Indian actor (d. 2014)
1951 – Ed Stelmach, Canadian farmer and politician, 13th Premier of Alberta
1954 – John Gregory, English footballer and manager
1955 – John DeStefano, Jr., American politician, 49th Mayor of New Haven
1957 – Mike Nesbitt, Northern Irish journalist and politician
1962 – Steve Bono, American football player
1964 – Bobby Witt, American baseball player
  1964   – Floyd Youmans, American baseball player, coach, and manager
1967 – Alberto García Aspe, Mexican footballer and manager
1969 – Mitch Healey, Australian rugby league player and coach
  1969   – Simon Vroemen, Dutch runner
1970 – Harold Ford, Jr., American lawyer and politician
  1970   – Jason Queally, English cyclist
1972 – Tomáš Dvořák, Czech decathlete and coach
1973 – Tsuyoshi Ogata, Japanese runner
1974 – Stanley Gene, Papua New Guinean rugby league player
  1974   – Darren Ward, English-Welsh footballer and coach
  1974   – Tony Warner, English born Trinidadian international footballer and coach
1975 – Francisco Cordero, Dominican-American baseball player
1976 – Kardinal Offishall, Canadian rapper and record producer/executive 
1977 – Pablo Gabriel García, Uruguayan footballer
  1977   – Victor Matfield, South African rugby player, coach, and sportscaster
  1977   – Bobby Roode, Canadian professional wrestler
1978 – Laetitia Casta, French model and actress
1981 – Lauren Jackson, Australian basketball player
1981 – JP Karliak, American actor, voice actor and comedian
1982 – Cory Monteith, Canadian actor and singer (d. 2013)
1983 – Matt Leinart, American football player
  1983   – Steven Sotloff, American-Israeli journalist (d. 2014) 
  1983   – Holly Valance,  Australian actress, singer and model
1984 – Andrés Iniesta, Spanish footballer
1985 – Beau Ryan, Australian rugby league player and television host
1986 – Abou Diaby, French footballer
  1986   – Miguel Veloso, Portuguese footballer
1987 – Lim Seul-ong, South Korean singer and actor 
  1987   – Monica Roșu, Romanian gymnast
1988 – Jeremy Maclin, American football player
  1988   – Brad Marchand, Canadian ice hockey player
1989 – Alyssa Brown, Canadian artistic gymnast
  1989   – Giovani dos Santos, Mexican international footballer
  1989   – Cam Newton, American football player
1992 – Thibaut Courtois, Belgian footballer
  1992   – Pablo Sarabia, Spanish footballer
1993 – Maurice Harkless, American-Puerto Rican basketball player
1994 – Hagos Gebrhiwet, Ethiopian runner
  1994   – Nene Macdonald, Papua New Guinean rugby league player
1995 – Gelson Martins, Portuguese footballer
1995 – Sachia Vickery, American tennis player
1998 – Viktória Kužmová, Slovak tennis player
1999 – Sabrina Carpenter, American singer and actress

Deaths

Pre-1600
 912 – Leo VI the Wise, Byzantine Emperor, the second ruler of the Macedonian dynasty (b.866).

1601–1900
1610 – Matteo Ricci, Italian priest and mathematician (b. 1552)
1778 – William Pitt, 1st Earl of Chatham, English soldier and politician, Prime Minister of the United Kingdom (b. 1708)
1779 – John Hart, American lawyer and politician (b. 1711)
1812 – Spencer Perceval, English lawyer and politician, Prime Minister of the United Kingdom (b. 1762)
1848 – Tom Cribb, English boxer (b. 1781)
1849 – Juliette Récamier, French businesswoman (b. 1777)
1882 – Frederick Innes, Scottish-Australian politician, 9th Premier of Tasmania (b. 1816)
1889 – John Cadbury, English businessman and philanthropist, founded the Cadbury Company (b. 1801)

1901–present
1908 – Charles Kingston, Australian politician, 20th Premier of South Australia (b. 1850)
1916 – Karl Schwarzschild, German astronomer and physicist (b. 1873)
1918 – George Elmslie, Australian politician, 25th Premier of Victoria (b. 1861)
1920 – James Colosimo, Italian-American mob boss (b. 1878)
  1920   – William Dean Howells, American novelist, literary critic, and playwright (b. 1837)
1927 – Juan Gris, Spanish painter and sculptor (b. 1887)
1929 – Jozef Murgaš, Slovak-American priest, architect, botanist, and painter (b. 1864)
1938 – George Lyon, Canadian golfer and cricketer (b. 1858)
1946 – Seán McCaughey Irish Republican, Hunger Striker
1955 – Gilbert Jessop, English cricketer (b. 1874)
1960 – John D. Rockefeller Jr., American businessman and philanthropist (b. 1874)
1963 – Herbert Spencer Gasser, American physiologist and academic, Nobel Prize laureate (b. 1888)
1967 – James E. Brewton, American painter (b. 1930)
1979 – Lester Flatt, American singer-songwriter and guitarist (b. 1914)
1981 – Odd Hassel, Norwegian chemist and academic, Nobel Prize laureate (b. 1897)
  1981   – Bob Marley, Jamaican singer-songwriter and guitarist (b. 1945)
1983 – Zenna Henderson, American writer (b. 1917)
1985 – Chester Gould, American cartoonist, created Dick Tracy (b. 1900)
1986 – Fritz Pollard, American football player and coach (b. 1894)
1988 – Kim Philby, British-Soviet double agent (b. 1912) 
1990 - Stratos Dionysiou, Greek Singer, composer and lyricist (b. 1935)
1994 – Timothy Carey, American actor, director, and producer (b. 1928)
2001 – Douglas Adams, English novelist and screenwriter (b. 1952)
2002 – Renaude Lapointe, Canadian journalist and politician (b. 1912)
  2002   – Bill Peet, American animator and screenwriter (b. 1915)
2003 – Noel Redding, English bass player (b. 1945)
2005 – Léo Cadieux, Canadian politician, 17th Canadian Minister of National Defence (b. 1908)
2006 – Floyd Patterson, American boxer and actor (b. 1935)
2007 – Malietoa Tanumafili II, Samoan ruler (b. 1913)
2008 – John Rutsey, Canadian drummer (b. 1953)
2009 – Abel Goumba, Central African physician and politician, Prime Minister of the Central African Republic (b. 1926)
  2009   – Claudio Huepe, Chilean economist and politician, Chilean Minister Secretary-General of Government (b. 1939)
  2009   – Sardarilal Mathradas Nanda, Indian admiral (b. 1915)
2010 – Doris Eaton Travis, American dancer and vaudevillian (b. 1904)
2011 – Robert Traylor, American basketball player (b. 1977)
2019 – Peggy Lipton, American actress, model, and singer (b. 1946)
  2019   – Thomas Silverstein, American murderer (b. 1952)
2020 – Jerry Stiller, American comedian, actor (b. 1927) 
2021 – Colt Brennan, American quarterback (b. 1983)
  2021   – Norman Lloyd, American actor, producer and director (b. 1914)

Holidays and observances
Christian feast day:
Anthimus of Rome
Gangulphus of Burgundy
Majolus of Cluny
Mamertus, the first of the Ice Saints

References

External links

 BBC: On This Day
 
 Historical Events on May 11

Days of the year
May